The Hills may refer to:

Popular culture

 "The Hills" (song), a 2015 song by The Weeknd from his second studio album Beauty Behind the Madness
 The Hills (TV series), an American reality television series that aired from 2006–2010
 The Hills: New Beginnings, the sequel series that premiered in 2019

Places

United States
 Neighborhoods within the Santa Monica Mountains in Los Angeles, California
 Bel Air, Los Angeles
 Beverly Hills, California
 Hollywood Hills
 The Hills, New Jersey, a census-designated place
 The Hills, Texas, a village

Australia
 Adelaide Hills, a section of the Mount Lofty Ranges
 Hills District, New South Wales, a district within Sydney
 The Hills Shire, a local government area within Sydney

See also
 The Hill (disambiguation)
 Hills (disambiguation)